The Archdeacon of Hastings is a senior ecclesiastical officer in the Church of England Diocese of Chichester. The Diocese of Chichester almost exactly covers the counties of East and West Sussex and the City of Brighton and Hove, stretching for nearly a hundred miles (160 km) along the south coast of England.

History
The two original archdeaconries of Chichester diocese, Chichester and Lewes, were created in the 12th century – at around the time when archdeacons were first appointed across England. The third archdeaconry, Hastings, was created (from that of Lewes) on 28 June 1912. The archdeaconries were then reorganised under Eric Kemp (Bishop of Chichester) on 28 June 1975: the Hastings archdeaconry was dissolved and her territory returned to Lewes archdeaconry, which was renamed "Lewes & Hastings"; and a new archdeaconry of Horsham was created.

On 12 May 2014, it was announced that the diocese is to take forward proposals to create a fourth archdeaconry (presently referred to as Brighton.) Since Lewes itself would be within the new archdeaconry, Lewes & Hastings archdeaconry would become simply Hastings archdeaconry. On 8 August 2014, the Church Times reported that the archdeaconry had been renamed.

List of archdeacons
Some archdeacons without territorial titles are recorded from the early 12th century; see Archdeacon of Chichester.

High Medieval
bef. 1164–?: Jordan de Melburne
bef. 1174–aft. 1199: Joceline
bef. 1207–aft. 1229 (res.): Eustachius de Leveland
aft. 1229–aft. 1239: Reginald de Wintonia
1240–1241: William de Lughteburg
5 March 1244 – 6 June 1252 (d.): Robert Passelewe
bef. 1253–aft. 1271: Simon de Clympingham
bef. 1279–aft. 1272: Henry
bef. 1279–aft. 1283 (res.): Godfrey de Peckham
bef. 1284–bef. 1301: Thomas de Berghstede

Late Medieval
bef. 1301–bef. 1305: Thomas Cobham
?–bef. 1305 (res.): John de Godele
16 April 1305–aft. 1305: Hamelin de Godele
bef. 1311–aft. 1313: John Geytentun
bef. 1316–aft. 1316: William de Estdene
bef. 1323–aft. 1323: Thomas de Codelowe
1339–bef. 1352 (d.): Walter de Lyndrich
1352–1358 (res.): William de Loughteburgh
bef. 1366–aft. 1391: John Courdray
Walter Forey (ineffective exchange, 8 May 1389)
Richard Stone
?–15 July 1395 (exch.): John Wendover
15 July 1395–aft. 1415: John Brampton
bef. 1419–aft. 1442: Lewis Coychurch
bef. 1450–aft. 1469: Thomas Hanwell
1474–?: William Skylton
?–2 March 1475 (exch.): John Dogett
2 March 1475 – 1483 (d.): John Plemth
1483–1486: Simon Climping
bef. 1484–bef. 1486 (res.): Thomas Oatley
31 May 1486–bef. 1489: Richard Hill
bef. 1489–1509 (res.): Edward Vaughan
22 March 1510–bef. 1512 (res.): William Atwater
17 December 1512 – 2 June 1516 (res.): William Cradock
30 September 1516 – 12 March 1520 (res.): Oliver Pole
12 March 1520–bef. 1527 (res.): Anthony Wayte
20 May 1528–bef. 1542 (d.): Edward More

Early modern
14 February 1542 – 1551 (d.): John Sherry
22 August 1551–bef. 1558 (d.): Richard Brisley
6 April 1558–bef. 1559 (deprived): Robert Taylor (deprived)
11 January 1560 – 1570 (d.): Edmund Weston
4 March 1570–bef. 1578 (d.): Thomas Drant
17 April 1578–bef. 1578 (deprived): William Coell
15 October 1578 – 1598 (res.): William Cotton
9 December 1598–bef. 1612 (d.): John Mattock
30 December 1612 – 12 August 1628 (d.): Richard Buckenham

14 March 1629 – 21 February 1644: William Hutchinson
?–bef. 1660 (res.): Thomas Hook
19 September 1660 – 4 March 1667 (d.): Philip King
27 March 1667–bef. 1670 (d.): Nathaniel Hardy
9 June 1670–bef. 1681 (d.): Toby Henshaw
8 December 1681–bef. 1693 (d.): Joseph Sayer
20 October 1693 – 18 August 1723 (d.): Richard Bowchier
24 September 1723 – 15 November 1736 (d.): James Williamson
25 March 1737 – 28 April 1751 (d.): Edmund Bateman
5 June 1751 – 27 January 1770 (d.): Thomas D'Oyly
31 May 1770 – 25 February 1806 (d.): John Courtail
29 April 1806–bef. 1815 (res.): Matthias D'Oyly
25 February 1815–bef. 1823 (res.): Edward Raynes
8 May 1823 – 25 February 1840 (d.): Thomas Birch
10 April 1840 – 23 January 1855 (d.): Julius Hare
6 March 1855 – 25 June 1876 (d.): William Otter

Late modern
1876–1 June 1888 (d.): John Hannah
1888–1908 (ret.): Robert Sutton
1908–1912 (res.): Theodore Churton (became Archdeacon of Hastings)
Lewes archdeaconry was split on 28 June 1912 to create Hastings archdeaconry.
1912–1923 (res.): Henry Southwell (also Bishop suffragan of Lewes from 1920)
1923–1929 (res.): Hugh Hordern
1929–1946 (ret.): Francis Smythe
1946–1959 (res.): Lloyd Morrell
1959–1971 (res.): Peter Booth
1972–1975: Max Godden (became Archdeacon of Lewes & Hastings)
On 28 June 1975, the Archdeaconry of Lewes was renamed Lewes & Hastings.

Archdeacons of Hastings (1912–1975)
1912–1 June 1915 (d.): Theodore Churton (previously Archdeacon of Lewes)
1915–1920 (res.): Benedict Hoskyns
1920–22 May 1922 (d.): Arthur Upcott
1922–16 October 1928 (d.): Thomas Cook (also Bishop suffragan of Lewes from 1926)
1928–1938 (res.): Arthur Alston
1938–1956: Ernest Reid
1956–1975 (ret.): Guy Mayfield
Hastings archdeaconry was dissolved and merged back into the Archdeaconry of Lewes/Lewes & Hastings on 28 June 1975.

Archdeacons of Lewes and Hastings (1975-2014)
1975–1988 (ret.): Max Godden (previously Archdeacon of Lewes)
1989–1991 (ret.): Christopher Luxmoore
1991–1997 (ret.): Hugh Glaisyer (archdeacon emeritus since 2007)
1997–2004 (res.): Nicholas Reade
2005–2014: Philip Jones (became Archdeacon of Hastings)

Archdeacons of Hastings (since 2014)
2014–31 January 2016 (ret.): Philip Jones (previously Archdeacon of Lewes & Hastings; became archdeacon emeritus)
5 January–29 March 2015: Stan Tomalin (acting)
31 January–18 September 2016: Edward Bryant & Nick Cornell (acting)
18 September 2016–present: Edward Dowler

Notes

References

Sources

For 1180–1486 archdeacons: 

Lists of Anglicans
Anglican ecclesiastical offices
 
 
 
Church of England
East Sussex-related lists
Archdeacon of Lewes and Hastings
History of East Sussex
Lists of English people